Armir Grimaj (born 16 June 1974) is an Albanian professional football coach and former player who is the manager of Albania women's national team.

Club career
Born in Shkodër, he played the majority of his career for hometown club Vllaznia and had a spell abroad with Ethnikos Piraeus in the Greek Super League

International career
He made his debut for Albania in a February 1998 Malta Tournament match against Georgia and earned a total of 4 caps, scoring no goals. His final international was a February 2000 Malta Tournament match against Andorra.

International statistics

Managerial career
On 22 April 2016, he was appointed at the helm of the women's national team, replacing the departed Altin Rraklli.

Personal life
On 22 September 2018, Grimaj was arrested as part of a criminal group named "Bajri" with the accusation of match fixing.

References

External links

1974 births
Living people
Footballers from Shkodër
Albanian footballers
Association football goalkeepers
Albania international footballers
KF Vllaznia Shkodër players
Ethnikos Piraeus F.C. players
FK Dinamo Tirana players
FK Partizani Tirana players
Albanian expatriate footballers
Expatriate footballers in Greece
Albanian expatriate sportspeople in Greece
Albanian football managers
KF Vllaznia Shkodër managers
Kategoria Superiore players
Kategoria Superiore managers